William James Hammell (28 June 1881 – 4 December 1959) was a Progressive party then Liberal member of the House of Commons of Canada. He was born in Raymond, Ontario and became a farmer.

He was first elected to Parliament at the Muskoka riding in the 1921 general election as a Progressive candidate. In 1922, his party allegiance switched to the Liberals. After completing his only term in the House of Commons, the 14th Canadian Parliament, Hammell left federal politics and did not seek re-election in the 1925 vote.

William James Hammell died in 1959 and was buried at Ullswater-North Cemetery in Ullswater, Ontario. His wife died in 1973 and was buried next to him.

References

External links
 

1881 births
Canadian farmers
Liberal Party of Canada MPs
Members of the House of Commons of Canada from Ontario
Progressive Party of Canada MPs
1959 deaths